Boardman Lake is an alpine lake in Camas County, Idaho, United States, located in the Soldier Mountains in the Sawtooth National Forest.  While no trails lead to the lake, it can be most easily accessed from trail 091.  The lake is north of Boardman Peak.

References

See also
 Sawtooth National Forest
 Soldier Mountains

Lakes of Idaho
Lakes of Camas County, Idaho
Glacial lakes of the United States
Glacial lakes of the Sawtooth National Forest